Chlorocoris distinctus is a species of stink bug in the family Pentatomidae. It is found in Central America, North America, and South America.

References

Articles created by Qbugbot
Insects described in 1851
Pentatomini